Nicholas Berthelot Lemann is an American writer and academic, the Joseph Pulitzer II and Edith Pulitzer Moore Professor of Journalism and Dean Emeritus of the Faculty of Journalism at the Columbia University Graduate School of Journalism. He has been a staff writer at The New Yorker since 1999. Lemann was elected to the American Philosophical Society in 2022.

Early life
Nicholas Lemann was born, raised, and educated in a Jewish family in New Orleans. He describes his family's faith as a "kind of super-Reform Judaism" where there were "no kosher laws, no bar mitzvahs, no tallit, no kippot".

Education
Lemann was educated at Metairie Park Country Day School, a private school in New Orleans, from which he graduated in 1972, followed by Harvard University, where he studied American history and literature, and was president of The Harvard Crimson, where he wrote the Brass Tacks column, and from which he graduated magna cum laude in 1976.

Life and career
Lemann began his journalism career as a 17-year-old writer for an alternative weekly, the Vieux Carre Courier, in his home city of New Orleans. In 1975, amid reports of mass murder in Cambodia by the Khmer Rouge, Lemann wrote, "I continue to support the Khmer Rouge in its principles and goals but I have to admit that I deplore the way they are going about it." After graduation, he worked at the Washington Monthly, as an associate editor and then managing editor; at Texas Monthly, as an associate editor and then executive editor; at The Washington Post, as a member of the national staff; at The Atlantic Monthly, as national correspondent; and at The New Yorker, as staff writer and then Washington correspondent.

On September 1, 2003, Lemann became dean of the Graduate School of Journalism at Columbia University. During Lemann's time as dean, the Journalism School launched and completed its first capital fundraising campaign, added 20 members to its full-time faculty, built a student center, started its first new professional degree program since the 1930s, and launched initiatives in investigative reporting, digital journalism, executive leadership for news organizations, and other areas. He stepped down as dean in 2013, following two five-year terms.

In 2015, Lemann launched Columbia Global Reports, a university-funded publishing imprint that produces four to six ambitious works of journalism and analysis a year, each on a different underreported story in the world. From 2017 to early 2021, he was the director of Columbia World Projects.

Lemann has published five books, including Transaction Man: The Rise of the Deal and the Decline of the American Dream (2019),  Redemption: The Last Battle of the Civil War (2006); The Big Test: The Secret History of the American Meritocracy (1999); and The Promised Land: The Great Black Migration and How It Changed America (1991), which won several book prizes. He has written widely for such publications as The New York Times, The New York Review of Books, The New Republic, and Slate; worked in documentary television with Blackside, Inc., Frontline, the Discovery Channel, and the BBC; and lectured at many universities.

Lemann serves on the boards of directors of the Authors Guild, the National Academy of Sciences’ Division of Behavioral and Social Sciences and Education, and the Academy of Political Science, and is a member of the New York Institute for the Humanities. He was named a fellow of the American Academy of Arts and Sciences in April 2010.

Personal
Lemann has been married twice. His first wife was Dominique Alice Browning, who later became an editor in chief of House & Garden until 2007; they married on May 20, 1983, have two sons, Alexander and Theodore, and later divorced. His second wife is Judith Anne Shulevitz, a columnist for Slate, The New York Times Book Review, and The New Republic. Married on November 7, 1999, they have a son and a daughter.

Bibliography

Books
 
 
 Redemption: The Last Battle of the Civil War (2006) - A History of Reconstruction in the South after the Civil War.
Transaction Man: The Rise of the Deal and the Decline of the American Dream (2019) - A history of the transformation of the U.S. economy from the early 20th century to the 2008 financial crisis, focusing on the rise of the corporation and financialization.

Essays and reporting
June–July 1986   on the black underclass and gang culture in Chicago.
June 1996  on Asian Americans as "the new Jews."
October 2004  on Philip Roth's The Plot Against America
September 2005 commentary on Hurricane Katrina
August 2006 article on Citizen journalism, titled "Amateur Hour: Journalism Without Journalists"
August 2007 commentary titled Rovian Ways on Karl Rove's resignation and legacy

Critical studies and reviews of Lemann's work
The big test
"None of the Above" Review, by Andrew Sullivan, The New York Times, October 24, 1999.
"BOOKS OF THE TIMES; What's Wrong With the SAT and Its Elite Progeny" Review by Christopher Lehmann-Haupt, The New York Times, October 4, 1999
Redemption
"A Less Perfect Union Review by Sean Wilentz, in The New York Times, September 10, 2006
First chapter of book, on The New York Times site.

Awards
1992 PEN/Martha Albrand Award for First Nonfiction for The Promised Land

References

External links
Audio Interview with Sam Tanenhaus, the editor of The New York Times Book Review (MP3 format).
Lemann and Steve Shepard discuss future of journalism.

 
 
 Nicholas Lemann: Growing Up Jewish in the American South

Living people
Year of birth missing (living people)
American journalism academics
The Atlantic (magazine) people
Columbia University Graduate School of Journalism faculty
Columbia University faculty
The Harvard Crimson people
Jewish American academics
Jewish American writers
The New York Times writers
The New Yorker people
Harvard College alumni
Fellows of the American Academy of Political and Social Science
21st-century American Jews
Members of the American Philosophical Society